The Philippine Fashion Week (PhFW) is a biannual week-long fashion show held in Metro Manila, Philippines. Dates are determined for the month of May, for showcasing holiday collections (instead of the autumn-winter categorizations which would not apply in the country), and then for the month of October, for showcasing spring and summer collections. It is the longest-running fashion event in the country, and the largest fashion event held in Manila, known as the "Olympics" of Philippine fashion. The Philippine Fashion Week was founded by Joey A. Espino Jr and Audie Espino in 1997. They continue to lead the project as executive producers along with the Espino brothers' protégé, Conchitina (Tina) Herrera.

Filipino designers including Ito Curata, Arcylen Moya, Ezra Santos, Oliver Tolentino, Albert Andrada, Jerome Salaya Ang, Noel Crisostomo, Jeffrey Rogador, Sidney Perez Sio, EsAc, Pat Santos, Arnold Galang, Roland Alzate, Raoul Ramirez, Lyle Ibanez, Cherry Samuya Veric, Philipp Tampus, Junjun Cambe, Mixy Dy, Jian Lasala, Randall Solomon, Kaye Morales, Boyet Dysangco, Anthony Nocom, Eric Delos Santos, Cesar Gaupo, Robin Tomas, Lesley Mobo, Frederick Peralta, Ben Farrales, Pitoy Moreno and Aureo Alonzo have presented full collections on Philippine Fashion Week's multi-media platform. The event is ‘by invitation only’ and participating designers pay a participation fee, with each designer undergoing a stringent selection process with their collections approved on the basis of design ingenuity.

Each season, Philippine Fashion Week generates extensive media coverage reaching an average audience of five million viewers, followers and fashion fans throughout the world.

As of 2008, it has been consistently held at the SMX Convention Center and SM Mall of Asia, until 2019 when it was held at Crowne Plaza Manila Galleria.

Some of the notable celebrities and personalities who have graced the runways of Philippine Fashion Week include Nina Garcia of Project Runway US, Gossip Girl's Leighton Meester, Keeping Up with the Kardashians' Rob Kardashian and Kylie Jenner, British supermodel David Gandy, America's Next Top Model's Allison Harvard and Dominique Reighard, Ford Models' Katie Ford, and the Miss Shapes, to name a few. International Filipino supermodels Charo Ronquillo, Charlene Almarvez, Danica Magpantay, Manuela Basilio and Paolo Roldan have also returned home to walk the event's runways.

Philippine Fashion Week continues to discover, nurture and showcase a new generation of designers who have gone on to attain global recognition, with their pieces worn by celebrities that include Beyoncé, Rihanna, Lady Gaga, Sofía Vergara, Christina Aguilera, Nicole Scherzinger, Jennifer Lopez, Chris Brown, Britney Spears, Fergie, Tyra Banks, Paula Patton, Paris Hilton, Dita Von Teese, Emmy Rossum and Mischa Barton.

Sponsorship 
Philippine Fashion Week is annually presented by Runway Productions, CalCarries, EsAC and Masters School for Models. In previous seasons Philippine Fashion Week was sponsored by MasterCard, L'Oreal Paris, Maybelline New York, Power Mac Center, Beats by Dre, Moshi, Gosh, Knomo London, Happy Plugs Stockholm, CaseMate, BDO, SM Residences, Hamilo Coast, Pico de Loro Club, Ipanema, Sony Vaio, Sony Cybershot, PLDT, Axe, Pond's, Sunsilk, Cream Silk, Magnum Ice Cream, Nestle, Emperador and Cignal TV, to name a few.

The government sector, including the Department of Agriculture, Fiber Industry Development Authority and Burdang Taal, in collaboration with Filipino designers has also turned to the runways of Philippine Fashion Week to shine the spotlight on local fabrics and craftsmanship.

Other special presentations on the runways of Philippine Fashion Week include SM Department Store's 50th anniversary celebration, A tribute to Louie Mamengo, A tribute to Joe Salazar, Salvacion Lim Higgins' Slim's at 50, Project Runway Philippines''' Season 1 and Season 2 finales, Ford Supermodel of the World Philippines, and Supermodel Philippines''.

Brands 
Participating brands in recent years have grown to include SM Store's SM Woman, SM Men, SM Kids, SM Shoes & Bags, Parisian, Forever 21, Alexander Wang X, H&M, The Ramp-Crossings Department Store, Rusty Lopez, Bench, Human, Kashieca, Freego, FG, Wrangler, Giordano, Vans, Guess, Levi's, Lee Jeans, Jag Jeans, Candie's, Folded & Hung, Triumph, Wharton, Jelly Bean, Bayo, Plains & Prints, Petit Monde, Barbie 50th Anniversary, Penshoppe, Oxygen, Regatta, Memo, For Me, Avon Fashion, Unica Hija, Sfera, Suite Blanco, Uno de 50, and Mint, showcasing their collection each season.

Early 2000s 
Philippine Fashion Week was previously held at Glorietta Activity Center, with offsite shows, parties and activities at the NBC Tent, The Rockwell Tent, InterContinental Manila and Shangri-la Makati. Its early years, the event took place for 7–10 days and saw the participation of mostly international fashion brands entering the Philippine market and group-show designers presenting capsule collections.

The Philippine Fashion Week has been held at venues that include the SMX Convention Center, SM Mall of Asia Arena, SM Mall of Asia and SM Aura, with off-site activities at Peninsula Hotel Manila and Raven Boutique Club.

In 2019, it was held at the Crowne Plaza Manila Galleria.

See also
 Runway Fashion

References

External links 

Events in Metro Manila
Culture in Manila
Fashion weeks